Evan Kostopoulos (born 7 May 1990) is an Australian footballer of Greek descent who currently plays for National Premier Leagues club Adelaide City FC.

Club career

AEK Athens and Panionios
In 2006–2007 season, Evan Kostopoulos had spent time on trial with Greek Super League clubs AEK Athens and Panionios GSS where he declined offers to return to Australia.

In 2007–2008 season, Kostopoulos played his first senior football game for South Australian Premier League club Adelaide Olympic where he was able to make 21 appearances scoring 6 goals.

In 2008–2009 season, Kostopoulos signed for then South Australian Premier League club Adelaide Comets where he played 18 games scoring 4 goals.

Adelaide United
In January 2010 Kostopoulos signed for Adelaide United in A-League. On 30 January 2010, Kostopoulos made his senior debut for Adelaide United replacing Adam Hughes in the 79th minute in the match against Wellington Phoenix.
At the end of the 2009–2010 A-League season Kostopoulos was loaned to Adelaide Cobras for 2010–2011 season.

On 14 April 2012, in the 2011–2012 A-League season it was announced that  Kostopoulos had signed a one-year undisclosed contract with Adelaide United until the end of the 2012–2013 A-League season. Kostopoulos scored his first A-League goal against Melbourne Victory in a 4–2 home victory.

Sydney Olympic FC
In November 2013, Evan Kostopoulos
met with Sydney Olympic FC officials and signed a deal with the Belmore-based club. His signature has been met with much praise from fans already, given his proven quality in the A-League.

References

External links
 
 

1990 births
Living people
Australian people of Greek descent
Australian soccer players
Croydon Kings players
Adelaide Comets FC players
Adelaide United FC players
Soccer players from Adelaide
A-League Men players
FFSA Super League players
Sydney Olympic FC players
South China AA players
National Premier Leagues players
Hong Kong First Division League players
Australian expatriate soccer players
Expatriate footballers in Hong Kong
Adelaide City FC players
Association football forwards